Bruno Ecuele Manga  (born 16 July 1988) is a Gabonese professional footballer who plays for the Gabon national team. He is known for being a tough tackler.

After beginning his career with FC 105 Libreville in his home country, joined French side Bordeaux in 2006. He played for the club's reserve side and spent time on loan with lower division side Rodez but only one appearance for the senior side, before being released in 2008. He subsequently joined Ligue 2 side Angers, making more than 50 appearances in two seasons before joining Lorient in 2010 for a fee of €2.5 million.

He made his Ligue 1 debut with Lorient and went on to make more than 100 appearances in the top tier of French football. He was appointed club captain ahead of the 2012–13 season and remained in the role until 2014 when he signed for Championship side Cardiff City for €5 million. He spent four seasons in the division before helping the club win promotion to the Premier League after finishing as Championship runners-up in the 2017–18 season.

Manga made his international debut for Gabon in 2006 and has accumulated 87 caps to date, representing the side at four Africa Cup of Nations tournaments.

Club career

Early career
Ecuele Manga began his career in his homeland with FC 105 Libreville, before being recommended to French Ligue 1 side Girondins de Bordeaux by Alain Giresse who was manager of the Gabon national team. After being involved in the club's preseason fixtures under manager Laurent Blanc, Ecuele Manga made his competitive debut for Bordeaux, making his first start, in the Matchday Six, in a 3–2 win over Panionios. However, he never played a league game for the club, and spent time on loan at Rodez.

At the end of his contract, he was signed on a free transfer by Angers on a three-year deal, lasting until 2011. There, Ecuele Manga was joined by two Gabonese compatriots, Arsène Do Marcolino and Fabrice Do Marcolino. Ecuele Manga made his Angers' debut in the opening game of the season, in a 0–0 draw against Bastia. He scored his first goal for the club on 24 October 2008, in a 2–0 win over Tours. On 3 March 2009, Ecuele Manga signed a new contract with the club, extending his deal until 2012. This came after a series impressive display at Angers caught attracted attention from several other clubs. In his first season at Angers, Ecuele Manga made thirty appearances, scoring twice.

Ahead of the 2009–10 season, Ecuele Manga was on the verge of joining Rennes in a deal worth €4 million. However, the move never happened. Ecuele Manga was absent at the start of the season and his first appearance came in a 0–0 draw against Strasbourg on 2 October. In his second game of the season against Strasbourg on 5 March 2010, Ecuele Manga scored the first brace of his career, in a 2–1 win. In his second season at Angers, Ecuele Manga made twenty-eight appearances, scoring three times. While at Angers, Ecuele Manga became an integral part of their defence set up, establishing himself in the first team. He later explained his departure from Angers.

Lorient
During the 2010 summer transfer window, he joined FC Lorient for €2.5 million, and became a first team regular in Ligue 1 as a replacement for Laurent Koscielny who left Lorient for Arsenal.
Ecuele Manga made his Lorient debut in the opening game of the season, making his first start, in a 2–2 draw against Auxerre.  Ecuele Manga was soon sidelined after injuring his hamstring in training, an injury that caused him to miss two matches in late-November. His season was further disrupted in mid-February when he injured his thigh. After making his return in a 3–3 draw against Arles-Avignon on 12 March 2011, Ecuele Manga scored his first Lorient goal, in a 3–1 loss against Montpellier on 11 May 2011. In his first season at Lorient, Ecuele Manga scored once in thirty-one appearances for the club.

Ecuele Manga's second season with the club started when he played as center-back in the first-twelve matches (including scoring his first goal of the season against Brest on 29 October 2011) until he was absent through injury and suspension. While on the sidelines, Ecuele Manga signed a new contract with the club, extending his deal until 2015. He made his return in early-December, in a 4–0 loss against Montpellier. On 17 March 2012, Ecuele Manga scored his second goal of the season, in a 2–1 win over Brest. Though scoring twice in thirty-two appearances in his second season, Ecuele Manga's agent announced that Ecuele Manga will stay at the club following a re–ignited interests from clubs around Europe.

At the start of the 2012–13 season, Ecuele Manga was appointed as the new captain of Lorient after replacing Fabien Audard. However, in the opening game of the season in a 2–2 draw against Paris Saint-Germain, Ecuele Manga injured his ligament, and he had to come off, as second half had just started and then it was announced that Ecuele Manga would be out for six months. After a six months absence, he made his return on 26 January 2013, in a 2–1 loss against Nancy. Ecuele Manga then scored his first goal of the season, in the Round of 16 of Coupe de France, in a 3–0 win over Brest. Ecuele Manga's captaincy came into question after Lorient lost 5–0 against Lille on 7 April 2013. In response, he reminded himself to take responsibilities as a captain. With the sideline kept Ecuele Manga for a long time, Ecuele Manga made seventeen appearances and scored once.

In the 2013–14 season, Ecuele Manga continued to remain Lorient captain throughout the season and captained thirty-three matches out of thirty-five appearances he made. Ecuele Manga scored his first goal for the club on 1 March 2014, in a 1–1 draw against Bastia. Ecuele Manga was absence for three matches, due to a knee injury occurring in late-February and a red card in May, which saw him suspended for one match. During the season, Ecuele Manga "won 119 aerial duels more than any other player".

Having received a red card in his second final game for Lorient, Ecuele Manga was suspended for the opening game of the 2014–15 season for Lorient and after making his return, Ecuele Manga captained once in his three appearances by the end of August. After Monaco announced their interest signing Ecuele Manga, Ecuele Manga hinted leaving Lorient, quoting: "I want to see something else, to have other challenges." With a one-year contract left at Lorient, there is slim chance for Ecuele Manga leave at the end of the transfer window.

Cardiff City

On 1 September 2014, Bruno Ecuele Manga signed for Welsh club Cardiff City for €5 million, keeping him until 2017.

Ecuele Manga then made his Cardiff City debut, making his first start, in a 1–0 loss against Middlesbrough on 16 September 2014. Ecuele Manga scored his first Cardiff City goal, in a 3–1 win over Leeds United two months later on 1 November 2014. However, Ecuele Manga was on the sideline after injuring his knee during a match against Bolton Wanderers and his international commitment and made his return for his thirteenth start of the season, in a 3–2 loss against Brentford on 20 December 2014.

Ecuele Manga was on the sideline again for his international commitment after being included for the Africa Cup of Nations. Ecuele Manga made his return, on 7 February 2015, in a 1–1 draw against Sheffield Wednesday. Ecuele Manga then scored his second goal of the season, in a 3–1 win over Rotherham United on 3 March 2015 and then his third goal came, a week later on 17 March 2015, in a 1–1 draw against Bournemouth. Ecuele Manga's impressive in his first season led calls for him to be named "Cardiff City's player of the season" by Wales Online.

During the pre-season, Ecuele Manga picked up a knee injury resulting in him missing out on the start of the season. Making his first appearance in the League Cup win over AFC Wimbledon and then being dropped back to the bench for the league games that followed. Whilst on international duty in September, he picked up a groin injury and was ruled out for two months. Ecuele Manga made his return to the first team coming on as a substitute for the injured, Sean Morrison against Birmingham City.

Despite another injury ridden season, Ecuele Manga was offered a new contract by manager, Neil Warnock, which was signed on 27 June 2017. He made a total of 43 appearances as Cardiff finished 2nd in the league, to earn promotion to the Premier League. He scored his only goal of the season in a 4–1 over Mansfield Town in the FA Cup.

Manga scored Cardiff's first goal of 2018–19 season in a 3–1 loss to Norwich City in the Football League Cup.

Dijon
On 19 July 2019, he completed a move to French side Dijon FCO.

International career

Born in Libreville, Gabon, Ecuele Manga was called up by Gabon in 2006.In 2012, he played in all 4 national team matches at the 2012 Africa Cup of Nations. As a result, Gabon reached the quarterfinals. In July 2012, Ecuele Manga represented Gabon at the 2012 Olympic Games held in London. However, they were eliminated in the group stage.

Career statistics

International goals
Scores and results list Gabon's goal tally first, score column lists each Ecuele Manga goal.

Honours
Cardiff City
EFL Championship runner-up: 2017–18

Gabon
King's Cup third place: 2018

Individual
Cardiff City Player of the Year: 2014–15

References

External links

1988 births
Living people
Sportspeople from Libreville
Gabonese footballers
Gabon international footballers
Association football defenders
FC 105 Libreville players
FC Girondins de Bordeaux players
Rodez AF players
Angers SCO players
FC Lorient players
Cardiff City F.C. players
Dijon FCO players
Ligue 1 players
Ligue 2 players
English Football League players
Premier League players
2010 Africa Cup of Nations players
2012 Africa Cup of Nations players
2015 Africa Cup of Nations players
2017 Africa Cup of Nations players
Olympic footballers of Gabon
Footballers at the 2012 Summer Olympics
Gabonese expatriate footballers
Expatriate footballers in France
Expatriate footballers in Wales
Gabonese expatriate sportspeople in France
Gabonese expatriate sportspeople in Wales
21st-century Gabonese people
2021 Africa Cup of Nations players